WMXM is an independent college radio station at Lake Forest College. According to its website, the goal of the station is to provide listeners an alternative to commercial radio through unique programming and music selection. The station broadcasts 24/7/365 with concentrations in indie rock, hip hop, RPM, hip-hop and loud rock. The station also offers live news updates and features the syndicated left-wing news program Democracy Now!. WMXM provides sports coverage for Forester teams.

WMXM hosts monthly concerts held in Lily Reid Holt Memorial Chapel, which are free to all.

References

External links

 

MXM
MXM
Radio stations established in 1988
1988 establishments in Illinois